Pterolophia elongata is a species of beetle in the family Cerambycidae. It was described by Maurice Pic in 1934.

References

elongata
Beetles described in 1934